Iraitz Arrospide (born 5 August 1988) is a Spanish long-distance runner. In 2020, he competed in the men's race at the 2020 World Athletics Half Marathon Championships held in Gdynia, Poland.

Career 

In 2018, he competed in the men's marathon at the 2018 European Athletics Championships held in Berlin, Germany. He finished in 34th place. He won the silver medal in the 2018 European Marathon Cup.

In 2019, he won the men's race at the IAU 50 km World Championships.

Achievements

Personal bests
10 km – 29:38 (San Sebastián, 2020)
Half marathon – 1:02:56 (Valencia, 2019)
Marathon – 2:10:59 (Valencia, 2019)
50 km – 2:47:42 (Brașov, 2019)

References

External links 
 

Living people
1988 births
Place of birth missing (living people)
Spanish male long-distance runners
Spanish male marathon runners
People from Tolosaldea
Athletes from the Basque Country (autonomous community)
Sportspeople from Gipuzkoa